The 10th Arizona State Legislature, consisting of the Arizona State Senate and the Arizona House of Representatives, was constituted from January 1, 1931, to December 31, 1932, during the first and second years of George W. P. Hunt's seventh tenure as Governor of Arizona, in Phoenix. The number of senators remained constant at 19, while the number of representatives increased from 54 to 63. The Democrats increased the large majorities they held in both houses.

Sessions
The Legislature met for the regular session at the State Capitol in Phoenix on January 12, 1931; and adjourned on March 14.

There were no special sessions of this legislature during 1931 and 1932.

State Senate

Members

The asterisk (*) denotes members of the previous Legislature who continued in office as members of this Legislature.

Employees
The following held unelected positions within the Legislature:

 Secretary: William J. Graham
 Assistant Secretary: B. F. Thum
 Sergeant-at-Arms: D. B. McHenry
 Chaplain: Dan P. Jones

House of Representatives

Members
The asterisk (*) denotes members of the previous Legislature who continued in office as members of this Legislature. The House grew by nine seats from the 9th Legislature: 5 in Maricopa County, 2 in Pima County, and 1 each in Gila and Yuma counties.

Employees
The following held unelected positions within the Legislature:

 Chief Clerk: Lallah Ruth
 Assistant Chief Clerk: Ruby Coulter
 Sergeant-at-Arms: Jack Provost
 Chaplain: Reverend C. M. Burkhart

References

Arizona legislative sessions
1931 in Arizona
1932 in Arizona
1931 U.S. legislative sessions
1932 U.S. legislative sessions